Mildred E. "Millie" Ketcheschawno (February 9, 1937 – December 11, 2000) was an activist for Native American rights and a filmmaker who was one of the founders of Indigenous Peoples' Day. In the 1970s, Millie became the first woman president of the Intertribal Friendship House. She received her Bachelor of Arts (Honors) from the University of California at Berkeley in American Indian studies and film in the late 1990s. Millie's activism began when she provided leadership to an important pan-ethnic movement known as the Indians of All Tribes movement (IOAT). Her advocacy was extended to the film industry when she became one of the writers for the documentary "Alcatraz is Not an Island," which was directed by James M. Fortier and released in 2001. Through her activism, she facilitated the counteraction of Columbus Day with the creation of Indigenous Peoples' Day, that is celebrated across the United States till present.

Life and family

Early life and education 
Born in 1937, Millie Ketcheschawno was from Oklahoma and left her hometown community at Shell Creek to attend an American Indian boarding school in Haskell, Kansas. Following her education, Millie Ketcheschawno would, similarly to many young Muscogee or Creek adults, leave her hometown and migrate to urban areas in part due to the Indian Relocation Act of 1953, drafted during the Indian termination phase of U.S. domestic policy. In the late 1950s, Ketcheshawno enlisted in the Federal relocation program.

After arriving in Oakland, California, and in San Francisco, Ketcheschawno created ties with other Native Americans who advocated for the preservation of Indigenous traditions and provided support to those affected by stereotypes and discrimination. More specifically, Millie Ketcheschawno would provide leadership to the Indians of All Tribes pan-ethnic movement based in San Francisco. This movement would, in 1969, sponsor the Alcatraz Island occupations.

In 1990 Millie enrolled for a Bachelor of Arts degree in American Indian studies and film at the University of California at Berkeley, where she graduated with honors in 1995.

Family 
Millie married Angelo Barichello sometime in the late 1950s, and they later divorced in the early 1970s. Together they had two children named Leslie and Gino. She later married her second husband, Vernon Ketcheshawno of the Kickapoo Nation. After their marriage, Millie and her family settled in Oklahoma. Vernon Ketcheshawno passed away in 1986. At the time of her passing, Millie left behind four children: Gino Barichello, Mike Deer, Jeff Ketcheshawno, and Jay Ketcheshawno. She is lived on by two grandsons and one great-grandson. She had two brothers named Bird Creek Phillips and Franklin Phillips, as well as other extended family members.

Career and activism

Alcatraz Island occupation: activism and documentary 

In 1963, the U.S. government closed a federal prison on Alcatraz Island in San Francisco Bay. The San Francisco United Council of Native Americans then proposed that the island become an ecology center for Native Americans. This was, however, objected to by the U.S. government which sparked an Indian-nationalist movement. This movement culminated with the occupation of Alcatraz Island by Native American activists, among them was Ketcheschawno. The idea behind the Occupation of Alcatraz was to lay claim to Indigenous land rights and rebuild Indian America. According to Millie's son Gino Barichello, his late mother was one of the first people to occupy Alcatraz.

This island would become a symbol of Native American activism. The slogan of this movement was the following: “Alcatraz is Not an Island”. It aimed to highlight how the movement’s aims went beyond the simple occupation of Alcatraz. In 2001, the documentary Alcatraz is Not an Island which was directed by James M. Fortier, and written by Troy Johnson, Jon Plutte, Mike Yearling and Millie Ketcheshawno, was released. The film won Best Documentary Feature at the American Indian Film Festival in San Francisco in 1999. This documentary chronicles the long struggle undertaken by Native Americans, and which altered U.S. government policies towards Indigenous communities. It further provides a perspective as to how this event transformed the way Native Americans perceive themselves and their heritage.

Leadership involvement in pan-ethnic indigenous activism 
Millie Ketcheschawno would remain a central figure in the organization of pan-Indian activism for the next decades. This was achieved through her leadership position in the Bay Area Native American Council and as the first woman president of the Intertribal Friendship House, a space essential in socialization and networking for Indian activists. In the last years of her life, her influence as an activist culminated in her sponsorship of the Indigenous Peoples' Day at Berkeley.

Founding of Indigenous Peoples Day (United States) 
Millie Ketcheschawno was one of the coordinators and founders of Indigenous Peoples' Day in Berkeley, California, along with other important committee members such as Don Littlecloud Davenport and Mark Gorrell. The roots of Indigenous Peoples' Day come from three important conferences: Geneva in 1977, Ecuador in 1990, and D-Q University in 1991. Indigenous Peoples' Day was created to criticize and question the myths about Christopher Columbus, as well as bring to light atrocities Indigenous peoples faced. The holiday is also about celebrating Native American culture. Other cities in the US also begun celebrating Indigenous Peoples' Day, inspired by the movement in Berkeley in which Ketcheschawno played a key role.

When the US Congress used the Bay Area for a commemoration of Columbus, there was a push to include Indigenous Peoples' Day in Berkeley. In 1991, the actions of the US Congress caused Ketcheschawno, who was a part of the Indigenous rights coalition called the Resistance 500, to advocate for Indigenous Peoples' Day. Ketcheschawno and other activists convinced the Berkeley City Council to vote in favor of making it an official holiday. Ketcheschawno also contributed to Indigenous Peoples' Day by being the director of the Inter-Tribal Friendship House in Oakland. This is where she helped spread information about the roots of the holiday, such as the 1977 Geneva Conference, which helped the group understand more about the complexities of Indigenous issues. Ketcheschawno was also the one who proposed to have their first pow-wow in Civic Center Park in Berkeley.

Late life 
Millie retired after a long and meaningful career in Shawnee, Oklahoma. On Monday, December 11, 2000, at the age of 63, Millie unfortunately suffered an accident in her home, which led to her passing. A wake was held after her passing in Eufaula, Oklahoma, at Gregg Funeral Chapel, and then her funeral service was held at Missionary Baptist Church. In the end, Millie was laid to rest at Greenwood Cemetery in Eufaula, Oklahoma.

References

Further reading 
 "Alcatraz Is Not an Island." Zinn Education Project. Rethinking Schools and Teaching for Change, May 16, 2022. https://www.zinnedproject.org/materials/alcatraz-is-not-an-island-dvd/.
 Bogado, Aura. “Celebrating Indigenous Peoples' Day.” The Nation, June 29, 2015. https://www.thenation.com/article/archive/celebrating-indigenous-peoples-day/.
 Chavers, Dean. “Alcatraz Is Not an Island.” World Literature Today 93, no. 4 (2019): 61–64. https://doi.org/10.7588/worllitetoda.93.4.0061.
 Curl, John. “Indigenous Peoples Day (2017).” John Curl, February 6, 2022. https://johncurl.net/indigenous-peoples-day-2017/.
 Curl, John and Millie Ketcheschawno. 2007. Indigenous Peoples’ Day & the Pow Wow Highway: A History of the New Holiday & the Pow-Wow Tradition. Accessed on March 12, 2023.
 http://www.red-coral.net/Pow.html
 IMDb.com. (January 24, 2001). Alcatraz is not an Island. IMDb. Retrieved March 12, 2023, from: https://www.imdb.com/title/tt0277561/.  
 Indigenous People's Day. Accessed March 3, 2023. http://www.ipdpowwow.org/Archives_3.html.
 Indigenous People's Day. Accessed March 3, 2023. https://www.red-coral.net/Pow.html#Millie.
 Kubal, Timothy. “Ethnic: American Indian.” Cultural Movements and Collective Memory, 2008, 57–75. https://doi.org/10.1057/9780230615762_4.
 Misiarz, Radosław. “The Society of American Indians and the ‘Indian Question,’ 1911–1923.” Accessed March 3, 2023. https://www.researchgate.net/publication/312565438_The_Society_of_American_Indians_and_the_Indian_question_1911-1923.
 Nanette Deetz. "What's Happened After Alcatraz in the Bay Area." ICT News, November 21, 2019, https://ictnews.org/news/whats-happened-after-alcatraz-in-the-bay-area.
 Nguyen, Ashley, and Claire Breen. “Today, Learn the Name of at Least One Influential Woman You've Never Heard of. Here Are 31 Options.” https://www.thelily.com. The Lily, March 26, 2019. https://www.thelily.com/today-learn-the-name-of-at-least-one-influential-woman-youve-never-heard-of-here-are-31-options/.
 Waterby, Ralph. Muscogee (Creek). New York: PowerKids Press, 2016. p.24-25
 “A Proclamation on Indigenous Peoples' Day, 2022.” The White House. The United States Government, October 7, 2022. https://www.whitehouse.gov/briefing-room/presidential-actions/2022/10/07/a-proclamation-on-indigenous-peoples-day-2022/ . 

1937 births
2000 deaths
Wikipedia Student Program